Anolis mestrei, the red-fanned rock anole or Pinardel Rio anole, is a species of lizard in the family Dactyloidae. The species is found in Cuba.

References

Anoles
Reptiles described in 1916
Endemic fauna of Cuba
Reptiles of Cuba
Taxa named by Thomas Barbour